Terpnissa listropterina is a species of beetle in the family Cerambycidae, the only species in the genus Terpnissa.

References

Elaphidiini